Dave Nieskens (born 29 April 1994) is a Dutch footballer who plays as a centre-back for RKSV Minor.

Career
Nieskens played for EVV and joined the joint academy at VVV and Helmond Sport, joining the latter's senior squad in June 2013. Nieskens played 35 times in the Eerste Divisie across two seasons, scoring four goals, and also had a loan spell at Visé. He then moved to Belgium again where he played for Bilzerse-Waltwilder and Houtvenne before joining Barrow for the 2017-18 season. After eight appearances and one goal, Nieskens left the club in December 2017 by mutual consent due to a knee injury. Nieskens joined Braintree Town in August 2018. Nieskens joined KFC Heur-Tongeren in January 2019.

References

External links
 
 Dave Nieskens at Footballdatabase
 Dave Nieskens at FuPa

1994 births
Living people
Dutch footballers
Dutch expatriate footballers
People from Sittard
Association football defenders
RKVV EVV players
VVV-Venlo players
Helmond Sport players
C.S. Visé players
Barrow A.F.C. players
Braintree Town F.C. players
Eerste Divisie players
National League (English football) players
Dutch expatriate sportspeople in Belgium
Dutch expatriate sportspeople in England
Dutch expatriate sportspeople in Germany
Expatriate footballers in Belgium
Expatriate footballers in England
Expatriate footballers in Germany
Footballers from Limburg (Netherlands)
KFC Houtvenne players